Scott Crichton (born 18 February 1954) is a former New Zealand rugby union player. A prop, educated at Wanganui Boys' College, Whanganui, Crichton represented Wellington at a provincial level, and was a member of the New Zealand national side, the All Blacks, from 1983 to 1985. He played seven matches for the All Blacks including two internationals.

References

1954 births
Living people
Rugby union players from Whanganui
New Zealand rugby union players
New Zealand international rugby union players
Wellington rugby union players
Māori All Blacks players
Rugby union props
People educated at Whanganui City College